Baron Baldassarre Squitti was a writer and professor of law in the Faculty of Law at the University of Naples and at "La Sapienza" The University of Rome,  and a member of the Italian Parliament, with Prime Minister Giovanni Giolitti.

Squitti was born in Maida, Catanzaro, Italy in 1855, the son of Baron Tommaso Squitti and Rosina Astanti. He was the brother of Senator Nicola Squitti, and Eleanora Maria Squitti, children of Baron Tommaso Squitti, Baron of Palermiti and Guarna, Italy. Eleanora Squitti was reported to be a lady companion of  Queen Margherita of Savoy.
 
Baldassarre was elected Member of Parliament for the Region of Monteleone Calabro(now Vibo Valentia) from 1904 to 1913.

Books written include the translation of "Institute of Roman Civil Law by the German writer, Eduardo BÖCKING" - (Naples, 1885).

References 

1855 births
Italian untitled nobility
Italian families
Year of death missing
Members of the Chamber of Deputies (Kingdom of Italy)